Medisize AG Switzerland is a Swiss plastics processing company, owned by the Dutch Philips-Medisize Corporation. The Medisize Switzerland was original created as Createch AG.

History 
Werner Dubach founded the company Createch in Nürensdorf, which produced various bottles and closures for the medical, cosmetics and food sector in the injection blow, injection blow stretching molding and injection molding process. It was planned to build a building consisting of several parts, with office, production and storage space. On the one hand, granting problems, which led to massive changes in the construction project, led to financial problems. In addition, copyright complaints were filed for the production of food-grade food packaging for Danone yoghurts and quarks by the toy manufacturer Lego. This leads to the bankruptcy of the company Createch and the main building was not completely finished. A part is still in the shell and is used as a warehouse. The Createch was passed on by the Credit Suisse Bank until the Dutch Medisize Group took over the company. The Createch was then renamed to Medisize Switzerland AG.
In the meantime Werner Dubach had founded the company Terxo AG Switzerland in Wetzikon with some former Createch employees and the financial commitment of Markus Schellenberg. Werner Dubach had designed and patented a number of closures, some of which are still produced today by Medisize, Terxo and the German Terxo partner company Bericap. Werner Dubach retired some years ago.

Products
Branch of industry: Plastic industry and packaging industry, food and medical packaging

Medisize Switzerland produces mainly closures for food packaging and cosmetics by means of injection molding machines and injection blowmachines, injection stretch blow molding machines as well as with assembly machines for further processing, but primarily packaging for medical products such as, for example, Eyedrops as well as bottles for drinks.
The Actifit bottles (polyethylene) for the milk processor Emmi, which produces medisize, have a great competitive pressure. This is because the company Terxo manufactures these bottles for Emmi too. In addition, the injection molding and injection blow molding machine manufacturer Ganahl, who has produced the corresponding tools for Terxo and Medisize, also manufactures such bottles by themselves. This means that there are three companies in the canton of Zurich, which all supply the same customer with the same product.

Equipment
Medisize uses injection molding machines of Japanese and German origin. Three Italian machines are available for the injection blow-molding machines, but the majority of injection-molding machines are Jomar machines with vertical plasticizing cylinders, which come from the US. Medisize Switzerland is the first production company to use a fully electric injection blow molding machine. This was developed by a German toolmaking company.

External links
 

Plastics companies of Switzerland
Companies based in Zürich